is a fictional character in the Tekken series of fighting games by Namco, where she was introduced in Tekken 3 in 1997. She is the adopted daughter of part-Native American and part-Chinese fighter Michelle Chang, and her storyline typically involves saving her tribe's forest. Despite this, she can be customized to resemble her real identity, but she will still have her intro and win poses, and extra moves.

Design and gameplay
Julia Chang is a young American woman with brown hair that she usually ties into braids. She made her debut in Tekken 3 at the age of 18, measuring 165 cm and 54 kg. Julia uses various Chinese martial arts, with many techniques similar to those of her mother. Like her mother, Julia usually dons a Native American-stylized outfit, with a crop top, a short denim skirt, cowgirl boots, and a small Native American feathered headdress (this headdress is absent in Tekken 4). As Julia becomes a member of a reforestation group starting in Tekken 4, she gains a researcher outfit and glasses. Her main costume in Tekken 7 is also more casual and modern, but she also has Native American attires including her classic outfit.

In Tekken 3, Julia is quite similar to Michelle, but needs more skill and perseverance from the player to achieve best results. According to CVG, "as well as lots of surprisingly powerful wrestling-style throws, Julia also has some fast kick combos." CVG guide to Tekken 3 states she "relies on quick stabbing attacks and floating combos to gradually wear down her opponent" and the aspect that makes her particularly "annoying to fight against is that she has lots of variations of the same attacks, and it takes some practice before [one] can anticipate her next move," as Julia players can mix these combos up to "really confuse" their opponents. In Tekken Tag Tournament, Julia is a "raw fury" whose her speed and her many combos might allow her to defeat any opponent. Julia lacks punching power, but she is able to perform quick combos and has many moves to perform juggle combos. She must be played aggressively but cautious and unpredictable, as she is very sensitive to counter-attacks, and as such it might take a lot of work to learn to play her right. Similarly, because of her "relatively small move list and her need to juggle to inflict real damage", Julia requires "the right amount of patience" in order to master her in Tekken 4. In Tekken 6, IGN considered her to have particularly many powerful mid-level attacks and to be one of the swiftest characters.

Appearances

In video games 
As a baby, Julia was abandoned in Native American lands and was found by Michelle Chang, who brought her up with love and taught her martial arts so she too could protect her homeland. Even though she is only an adopted daughter of Michelle, they share very similar appearance to the extent that she becomes the target of Ganryu's affections primarily because of her resemblance to Michelle.

Julia studied archaeology in Michelle's tribal lands. When she turned eighteen, stories of sudden disappearances of martial artists around the world reached the tribe. The tribe knew that they were caused by the God of Fighting and feared that Michelle's pendant was the cause. Michelle went to Japan to ask Heihachi Mishima for having pursued the pendant years before, but she did not return. Julia suspected Heihachi and entered the third King of Iron Fist Tournament to seek the truth.

Fearing that the rapidly growing global ecosystem would threaten her homeland, Julia joined a genetic research group headed by Professor T that studied the biological mechanism of reforestation. The group worked closely with G Corporation, whose high-tech computers were being used to store the data of the research. However, the research came to an abrupt halt when Mishima Zaibatsu broke to G Corporation and stole all of their data. Knowing that she needed the data to save her home, Julia entered the King of Iron Fist Tournament 4 to take back the forest rejuvenation data. She failed to obtain it and tried to resume her research, but was always reminded that without the data, her research was futile. One day, Julia received a letter in a foreign language that announced the King of Iron Fist Tournament 5. She signed in, hoping to once again retrieve the data.

After finally retrieving her stolen data, Julia completed her research and went back to Arizona to meet with the group that would help her realize her plan. She also met with an old woman who claimed that she could hear the spirits. She helped Julia with the rejuvenation program, but just before the latter left, she gave an ominous warning that Jin Kazama and Kazuya Mishima were not allowed to clash, since doing so would resurrect a great evil that would end the world. To prevent this from happening, Julia decided to enter the sixth King of Iron Fist Tournament, the one after Jin Kazama defeated his great-grandfather.

Julia is playable in Tekken 7 as part of Season 2 DLC. After retiring as the masked fighter Jaycee, Julia concentrated fully on expanding her reforestation efforts around the globe, far from the fighting scene. But her project quickly needed money. Finding it difficult to secure backers, Julia was forced to return to the fight far sooner than she had wanted. Seeking one final fight, she made it her mission to beat Kazuya Mishima, after his devil form is exposed to almost every public by Heihachi. Doing so, she theorised, would gain the global attention, and subsequent funding, that her project required. In contrast to previous games, her personality is drastically changed. She is cheerful and bubbly like Virtual Youtuber Kizuna Ai. 

Julia appears as a playable character in the non-canonical games Tekken Tag Tournament and Tekken Tag Tournament 2, as well as in Tekken Card Challenge, and makes a cameo appearance in the spin-off game Death by Degrees. Julia also appears as a playable character in the crossover game Street Fighter X Tekken, where her official partner is Bob, and where Chun-Li gave her classic outfit after they have become friends through studying Chinese kempo together.

Other appearances
Julia's dossier is briefly seen in a cameo in the CGI film Tekken: Blood Vengeance when Anna Williams opens a file containing dossiers on various persons of interest. Julia also appears in the manga Tekken: Tatakai no Kanatani and in the comic book Tekken Forever. A resin garage kit figure of Julia from Tekken 4 was released by Heihachi Zazen in 2003, and a prepainted 1/7 scale PVC figure of Julia as Jaycee from Tekken Tag Tournament 2, designed by the graphic artist Yamashita Shunya, was released by Kotobukiya in 2013.

Jaycee (or J.C) 

In Tekken Tag Tournament 2, Julia Chang appears under the alias Jaycee or J.C., who is a luchadora. She is seen in the opening trailer as a wrestler and tag partner of Armor King, wearing a lucha mask to take the place of a friend of hers who was injured in a car accident. In Michelle's TTT2 ending cutscene, she dons a lucha libre mask to team-up with Jaycee against King and Armor King. Jaycee has been also playable in place of Julia in the free-to-play game Tekken Revolution as part of an update.

Jaycee can be customized to resemble her real form (Julia Chang), but she will have her same poses and luchador moves.

The Tekken series' producer Katsuhiro Harada confirmed that "Jaycee" is actually a pun on the name Julia Chang (removing her mask in the games customization feature changes her name back to Julia in-game). In Tekken Tag Tournament 2, Julia gains some luchador moves, while still keeping most of the moves she had in Tekken 6. Some of the attacks removed from Julia's move list in the game are given to Michelle.

Reception
Polish edition of GameStar had Julia Chang voted at 11th place in the 2006 poll for the title of "Miss of the Video Game World". In 2009, GameDaily listed her among "chicks that will kick your ass" along with three other Tekken 5 characters, featured her among the "Babes of Tekken", also listing her among the "All-American Girls". In 2011, UGO Networks featured Julia as one of the fighting games' "finest female fighters", adding that she is their favorite Native American fighting game character. In 2012, Entertainment Focus ranked Julia as the eighth best video game heroine, stating that "her hippy style and toned midriff – combined with lethal moves and passion for the planet make her one uniquely attractive package." She was ranked as the 29th best looking game girl by GameHall's Portal PlayGame in 2014.  PlayStation Official Magazine listed her Cross Assault team-up with Nina Williams in Street Fighter X Tekken as one of the best in the game.

Julia has been one of the most popular characters among the professional players of Tekken 4. In 2013, Complex ranked Julia as the 18th best Tekken character, commenting: "Julia is the thinking man's video game crush – an intellectual with a naughty librarian look. Like her mother before her, Julia is that crunchy hippie girl on campus – you'd go to a protest rally just to get her number. Julia is the classic 'pitbull' character, who overwhelms her opponent with relentless punches and elbows. Armed with one of the most punishing command throws on the roster, she'll be breaking nerds' hearts for years to come." In an official poll by Namco, Julia was the 22nd most requested Tekken character to be added to the roster of Tekken X Street Fighter, racking up 6.35% of votes; additional 4.21% votes were also cast on Jaycee, counted separately. Julia's absence from Tekken 7 was met with a widespread disappointment; she was the second most missing character in the game according to a poll by fighting game community EventHubs.

There has been some negative criticism. Upon Julia Chang's debut in Tekken 3, Next Generation commented that she and fellow Tekken 3 character Ling Xiaoyu "conform to different and equally depressing 'cute schoolgirl' stereotypes". In 2011, Dorkly listed her as one of the most stereotypical Native American characters in fighting game history, ranking her at seventh place, tying with Michelle Chang, even as Beth Aileen Dillon of AbTeC (Aboriginal Territories in Cyberspace) called Julia "an interesting case" and appreciated "that she is educated and kicks ass." Jeff Marchiafava of Game Informer included Jaycee among the "most ridiculous" characters of Tekken Tag Tournament 2.

See also
List of Tekken characters

References

Adoptee characters in video games
Teenage characters in video games
Female characters in video games
Fictional activists
Fictional archaeologists
Fictional characters from Arizona
Fictional characters with alter egos
Fictional college students
Fictional martial artists in video games
Fictional female martial artists
Fictional hapkido practitioners
Fictional kenpō practitioners
Fictional luchadores
Fictional Native American people in video games
Fictional female scientists
Fictional American people in video games
Fictional professional wrestlers
Fictional scientists in video games
Fictional Xing Yi Quan practitioners
Tekken characters
Woman soldier and warrior characters in video games
Video game characters introduced in 1997